Raúl Alberto Lozano (born 2 September 1997) is an Argentine professional footballer who plays as a right-back for Patronato, on loan from Quilmes.

Career
Lozano started his career with Quilmes. He was picked for his senior debut in May 2017 against Gimnasia y Esgrima in the Copa Argentina, with the defender playing the full duration of a penalty shoot-out defeat. In the succeeding June, Lozano was an unused substitute on two occasions in the Primera División but never made it on as Quilmes suffered relegation in 2016–17. His professional bow eventually arrived in the 2018–19 Primera B Nacional on 27 August 2018 versus Atlético de Rafaela, as Lozano started and finished the opening seventeen matches of Quilmes' season; only missing game eighteen due to suspension.

In July 2020, Lozano joined Huracán on loan for the rest of the year, with a option to extend the loan with one year, if Lozano had played 50% of the games for Huracán. In January 2021, the deal was extended for one year, until the end of 2021. In January 2022, Lozano was loaned out to fellow league club Patronato until the end of 2022 with a purchase option.

Career statistics
.

References

External links

1997 births
Living people
Sportspeople from Buenos Aires Province
Argentine footballers
Association football defenders
Primera Nacional players
Argentine Primera División players
Quilmes Atlético Club footballers
Club Atlético Huracán footballers
Club Atlético Patronato footballers